A Tian (Chinese: 阿田 "A Tian", "our little Tian") is Justin Lo's fourth studio album which was released on September 30, 2008. It was his first released album since Gold Label Records acquired EMI Music Taiwan and EMI Music China (Typhoon Records) in 2008, reforming to Gold Typhoon Entertainment Ltd.

Track listing
"三十日"
"世界小姐"
"信我"
"未輸"
"闊太"
"側太" (feat sister Roxane Lo)
"雲"
"Intoxication"
"中環"
"自身"

External links
Album's information on moov.hk (in Chinese)

Justin Lo albums
2008 albums